Lois Tilton is an American science fiction, fantasy, alternate history, and horror writer. She won the Sidewise Award for Alternate History in the short form category for her story "Pericles the Tyrant" in 2006.  In 2005, her story, "The Gladiator's War" was a nominee for the Nebula Award for Best Novelette. She has also written several novels concerning vampires and media-related novels, one each in the Babylon 5 and Deep Space Nine universes.

She was a short fiction reviewer for the website Locus Online from March 2010 till January 2016.  Previously, she reviewed short fiction for The Internet Review of Science Fiction.

Novels
Vampire Winter (1990) 
Darkness on the Ice (1993)  
Written in Venom (2000)
Darkspawn (2000)

Star Trek novels
Betrayal (1994)

Babylon 5 novels
Babylon 5: Accusations (1995)

Short stories
 The Craft of War (1998) (collected in Harry Turtledove's anthology Alternate Generals)

External links

Lois Tilton's reviews at Locus Online
2014 short fiction in review, by Lois Tilton

1946 births
Living people
Sidewise Award winners
American horror writers
American fantasy writers
American science fiction writers
Women science fiction and fantasy writers
20th-century American novelists
21st-century American novelists
20th-century American women writers
21st-century American women writers
American women short story writers
Women horror writers
American women novelists
Women historical novelists
20th-century American short story writers
21st-century American short story writers